Madelyn Gould is the Columbia University Vagelos College of Physicians and Surgeons’ is the Irving Philips Professor of Epidemiology in Psychiatry and a research scientist at the New York State Psychiatric Institute.  She is also an epidemiologist with a focus on youth suicide.

Education and training
Gould earned an MPH with a focus on Epidemiology in 1976 from the Columbia University Mailman School of Public Health, followed by a PhD in Epidemiology (1980) from the Columbia Graduate School of Arts and Sciences and a fellowship (1979) at the Columbia University Mailman School of Public Health.

Gould received a MA from Princeton IN 1974, and. BS from Brooklyn College in 1972.

Career
She has spent more than 20 years, Gould has evaluated the  National Suicide Prevention Hotline founded by Substance Abuse and Mental Health Services Administration (SAMHSA).

Awards and honors
Shneidman Award for Research, American Association of Suicidology (AAS), 1991

Selected publications
 Forum on Global Violence Prevention; Board on Global Health; Institute of Medicine; National Research Council. Contagion of Violence: Workshop Summary. Washington (DC): National Academies Press (US); 2013 Feb 6. II.4, THE CONTAGION OF SUICIDAL BEHAVIOR. Available from: https://www.ncbi.nlm.nih.gov/books/NBK207262/
 Pirkis J, Gunnell D, Shin S, Del Pozo-Banos M, Arya V, Aguilar PA, Appleby L, Arafat SMY, Arensman E, Ayuso-Mateos JL, Balhara YPS, Bantjes J, Baran A, Behera C, Bertolote J, Borges G, Bray M, Brečić P, Caine E, Calati R, Carli V, Castelpietra G, Chan LF, Chang SS, Colchester D, Coss-Guzmán M, Crompton D, Ćurković M, Dandona R, De Jaegere E, De Leo D, Deisenhammer EA, Dwyer J, Erlangsen A, Faust JS, Fornaro M, Fortune S, Garrett A, Gentile G, Gerstner R, Gilissen R, Gould M, Gupta SK, Hawton K, Holz F, Kamenshchikov I, Kapur N, Kasal A, Khan M, Kirtley OJ, Knipe D, Kõlves K, Kölzer SC, Krivda H, Leske S, Madeddu F, Marshall A, Memon A, Mittendorfer-Rutz E, Nestadt P, Neznanov N, Niederkrotenthaler T, Nielsen E, Nordentoft M, Oberlerchner H, O'Connor RC, Papsdorf R, Partonen T, Phillips MR, Platt S, Portzky G, Psota G, Qin P, Radeloff D, Reif A, Reif-Leonhard C, Rezaeian M, Román-Vázquez N, Roskar S, Rozanov V, Sara G, Scavacini K, Schneider B, Semenova N, Sinyor M, Tambuzzi S, Townsend E, Ueda M, Wasserman D, Webb RT, Winkler P, Yip PSF, Zalsman G, Zoja R, John A, Spittal MJ. Suicide numbers during the first 9-15 months of the COVID-19 pandemic compared with pre-existing trends: An interrupted time series analysis in 33 countries. EClinicalMedicine. 2022 Aug 2;51:101573. doi: 10.1016/j.eclinm.2022.101573. PMID: 35935344; PMCID: PMC9344880

References

American women epidemiologists
American epidemiologists
Columbia University Mailman School of Public Health alumni
Columbia University Mailman School of Public Health faculty
Columbia Graduate School of Arts and Sciences alumni
Columbia Medical School faculty
Suicidologists
New York State Psychiatric Institute people
Brooklyn College alumni
Princeton University alumni
Year of birth missing (living people)
Living people